Bharath Niketan College of Engineering is a College of Engineering that is located in Thimmarasanayakanoor, Andipatti, Theni District in Tamil Nadu state, India.

External links
 

Engineering colleges in Tamil Nadu
Theni district